"Love Is Strong" is a song by English rock band the Rolling Stones, released as the opening track, and first single, from their 20th British and 22nd American studio album, Voodoo Lounge (1994). Issued as a single on 4 July 1994, the song preceded the release of Voodoo Lounge by a week. "Love Is Strong" peaked at  14 in the band's native United Kingdom and at No. 2 in Canada and Finland but stalled at No. 91 on the US Billboard Hot 100. Despite this, it peaked at No. 2 on the Billboard Album Rock Tracks chart. The song's accompanying music video received heavy rotation on MTV Europe.

Inspiration and recording
Written by Mick Jagger and Keith Richards, "Love Is Strong" is a brooding number about an encounter between the singer and an unnamed person which leads the singer to a "love/lust at first sight" immediate attraction and longing for the couple to unite despite the obstacles.

The song was written in Ireland by Richards and originally had the name "Love is Strange". Popular bootlegs of the sessions abound, as Ron Wood, Richards, Ivan Neville and producer Don Was worked the song while Jagger was supporting his record Wandering Spirit. Later takes have Richards changing the title to "Love is Strong"; although the final release was significantly altered by Jagger's added lyrics and use of a harmonica, a trademark instrument for him rarely utilized in the Stones' middle period work. Jagger said at the time of its release, "We ran through it a bunch of times and I was playing harmonica, and I started singing through the harmonica mike, so you get this strange sort of sound. And then I started singing down an octave, so you get this kind of breathy, sexy tone... It was good to put harmonica on a track like this. You always think of playing it on a 12-bar blues, and it's kind of fun to put it on one which is not. It's good to work with another sequence."

Recording began in September 1993 at Wood's home studio in Ireland and continued at A&M Recording Studios in Los Angeles in 1994.

Release
Released as the first single from the album, "Love Is Strong" performed below expectations, barely making it into the Billboard Hot 100 singles chart in the US. It became the lowest charting first single ever by the band and marked a change in the composition of the singles chart as well as the Stones role on it. Despite this, the song remains one of the band's well-known songs from the 1990s. Five years earlier "Mixed Emotions" was a Top 5 pop chart single. Considerable promotional expense was spent on the Voodoo Lounge CD release, as it was the first on Virgin Records, including a popular music video directed by David Fincher and edited by Robert Duffy at Spot Welders; the black and white video shows giant versions of the Stones, as well as a few residents locked in romantic embraces, rambling about New York City. It received heavy rotation on MTV Europe in August 1994.

The single's weaker-than-expected lead dampened CD sales, despite positive critical reviews and a Grammy Award win for Best Short Form Music Video. In time, the track proved popular in Europe going to No. 14 in the UK and received significant airplay in the US, but only peaked at No. 91 on the Billboard Hot 100. The commercial response in Canada was considerably stronger, where the song reached No. 2 on the RPM Singles Chart on 19 September 1994, behind "You Better Wait" by Journey frontman Steve Perry.

The Rolling Stones performed the song at the 1994 MTV Video Music Awards. Although it had disappeared from several recent concert tours setlists in favour of the more live-friendly "You Got Me Rocking" (the follow-up single from Voodoo Lounge), the Stones reintroduced "Love Is Strong" to their A Bigger Bang Tour setlist on 22 July 2007 at their Brno, Czech Republic show and at their Hamburg show in August.

It was included on their 2002 career compilation album Forty Licks.

Critical reception
Steve Baltin from Cash Box wrote, "With U2 and R.E.M. making so many great records already this decade, it’s hard to call the Rolling Stones the “world’s greatest rock ’n’ roll band” anymore. However, they’re still the Stones, and this is one cool song." He added, "Trademark Jagger all the way vocally, the song oozes the sex appeal that made the man a legend. In addition, it’s hard to ignore any Keith Richards riff, and this song opens with the classic Richards’ styling. It may not be “Satisfaction” or “Gimme Shelter”, but whaddaya want—it’s still the Stones." David Sinclair from The Times commented, "As well as a typically salacious vocal, Mick Jagger contributes reedy blasts of harmonica which intertwine loosely with the sinuous chop and grind of Keith Richards's suspended-seventh chords. The lyric seems a shade unadventurous. Isn't there something that these 50-year-olds can get excited about other than how big and strong their love still is?"

Track listings

 UK and Australian CD1 
 "Love Is Strong" (Teddy Riley radio remix)
 "Love Is Strong" (Teddy Riley extended remix)
" Love Is Strong" (Teddy Riley extended rock remix)
 "Love Is Strong" (Teddy Riley dub remix)
 "Love Is Strong" (Joe the Butcher club mix)
 "Love Is Strong" (Teddy Riley instrumental)

 UK and Australian CD2, Japanese CD single 
 "Love Is Strong" (album version)
 "The Storm"
 "So Young"
 "Love Is Strong" (Bob Clearmountain remix)

 UK 7-inch and cassette single, European CD single 
 "Love Is Strong" (album version)
 "The Storm"

 US maxi-CD single and Canadian CD single 
 "Love Is Strong" – 3:46
 "Love Is Strong" (Teddy Riley extended remix) – 5:02
 "Love Is Strong" (Teddy Riley dub) – 4:05
 "Love Is Strong" (Teddy Riley extended rock remix) – 4:47
 "The Storm" – 2:48

 US 12-inch single 
A1. "Love Is Strong" (Teddy Riley extended remix) – 5:02
A2. "Love Is Strong" (Teddy Riley extended rock remix) – 4:47
A3. "Love Is Strong" (Teddy Riley dub remix) – 4:05
B1. "Love Is Strong" (Joe the Butcher club mix) – 5:23
B2. "Love Is Strong" (album version) – 3:46
B3. "Love Is Strong" (Teddy Riley instrumental) – 4:47

 US 7-inch and cassette single 
A1. "Love Is Strong" – 3:46
B1. "The Storm" – 2:48
B2. "Love Is Strong" (Teddy Riley extended remix) – 5:03

Personnel
 Mick Jagger – lead vocals, harmonica, maracas
 Keith Richards – electric and acoustic guitars, backing vocals
 Ron Wood – electric and acoustic guitars, backing vocals
 Darryl Jones – bass guitar
 Charlie Watts – drums
 Bernard Fowler and Ivan Neville – background vocals
 Chuck Leavell – Wurlitzer piano and Hammond organ

Charts

Weekly charts

Year-end charts

References

The Rolling Stones songs
1994 singles
1994 songs
Black-and-white music videos
Grammy Award for Best Short Form Music Video
Music videos directed by David Fincher
Song recordings produced by Don Was
Song recordings produced by Jagger–Richards
Songs written by Jagger–Richards
Virgin Records singles